Layang-Layang is a state constituency in Johor, Malaysia, that is represented in the Johor State Legislative Assembly.

Demographics

Polling districrs 
According to the federal gazette issued on 30 March 2018, the Layang-Layang constituency is divided into 14 polling districts.

Representation history

Election results

References 

Johor state constituencies